Theron Rudd Strong (November 7, 1802 Salisbury, Litchfield County, Connecticut – May 14, 1873) was an American lawyer and politician from New York. From 1839 to 1841, he served one term in the U.S. House of Representatives.

Life
He studied law at Litchfield Law School. He was admitted to the bar in 1821, and commenced practice in Palmyra. In 1833, he married Abbie Louise Hart (1814–1840), daughter of State Senator Truman Hart.

Theron R. Strong was District Attorney of Wayne County from 1835 to 1839.

Congress 
Strong was elected as a Democrat to the 26th United States Congress, and served from March 4, 1839, to March 3, 1841.

Later career 
He was a member from Wayne County of the New York State Assembly in 1842.

He was a justice of the New York Supreme Court (7th District) from 1852 to 1859, and ex officio a judge of the New York Court of Appeals in 1858. He removed to Rochester, New York, the seat of the district bench, and afterwards resumed the practice of law there.

He removed to New York City in 1867, and continued the practice of law.

Death 
He was buried at the Mount Hope Cemetery, Rochester.

Family 
Congressman William Strong, of Pennsylvania, was his cousin.

Sources

The New York Civil List compiled by Franklin Benjamin Hough (pages 227, 308, 352 and 384; Weed, Parsons and Co., 1858)
 Court of Appeals judges

External links 
 

1802 births
1873 deaths
Burials at Mount Hope Cemetery (Rochester)
Litchfield Law School alumni
People from Salisbury, Connecticut
People from Palmyra, New York
New York Supreme Court Justices
Judges of the New York Court of Appeals
Politicians from Rochester, New York
Democratic Party members of the New York State Assembly
Democratic Party members of the United States House of Representatives from New York (state)
19th-century American politicians
Lawyers from Rochester, New York
Wayne County District Attorneys
19th-century American judges
19th-century American lawyers